The Deesbach Forebay is a dam in the German state of Thuringia in the Thuringian Highland. It impounds the river Lichte and lies between the municipalities Lichte (Geiersthal) and Unterweissbach. That particular forebay belongs to the Leibis-Lichte Dam (de: Talsperre Leibis-Lichte).

The name, Deesbach Forebay, was derived d from the close proximity to the municipality Deesbach.

See also 
 List of reservoirs and dams in Germany

References

External links 
Leibis-Lichte Dam on  homepage of the Thuringian long-distance water supply (de: Tueringer Fernwasserversorgung
Homepage (private) concerning the Leibis-Lichte Dam
Pictures of the building site on baustellen-doku.info

Reservoirs in Thuringia
Dams in Thuringia
Lichte
Dams completed in 1991
Buildings and structures in Saalfeld-Rudolstadt
1991 establishments in Germany
RDeesbach